This page includes a list of biblical proper names that start with J in English transcription. Some of the names are given with a proposed etymological meaning. For further information on the names included on the list, the reader may consult the sources listed below in the References and External Links.

A – B – C – D – E – F – G – H – I – J – K – L – M – N – O – P – Q – R – S – T – U – V – Y – Z

R

Jaakan, intelligent, 
Jesus, God saves,  saviour;
Jaala, ascending, a little doe or goat; wild goat;' 
Jaalam, he will be hid,Jaanai, Jehovah answers,Jaasau,  Jehovah makes,Jaasiel, God is maker,Jaasu, created;Jaazaniah, Jehovah does hear,  may God hear'Jaaziah, God consoles or determines,  may God strengthen,Jaaziel, God is determining or consoling, may God strengthen,Jabal, a river, moving, or which glides away, stream,Jabbok
Jabesh, a dry place; dry,Jabez, he makes sorrow or height; sorrow;
Jabin, Jabneh, God discerns or intelligent; he understands,
Jabneel
Jachan, afflicting or troublous; affliction,
Jachin he does establish or founding; established;
Jacob, he that supplants or follows after; supplanted;
Jada, wise
Jadau, favorite or friend
Jadon, he that rules or abids,
Jaddua, very knowing,
Jael, Ibex - Judges 4:17
Jagur
Jah
Jahath, revival or grasping;
Jahaz
Jahaziah, Jehovah reveals; Jehovah sees;
Jahaziel, God sees or reveals,
Jahdai, guide or he directs,
Jahdiel, union of God or God makes glad;
Jahdo, union; 
Jahleel, God waits or God does grievously afflict; 
Jahmai, Jehovah protects;
Jahzeel, God apportions or distributes;
Jahzerah
Jair, Jehovah enlightens, arouses or who diffuses light;
Jairus, He will enlighten or diffuse light;
Jakan
Jakeh, pious or hearkening;
Jakim
Jalon
Jambres
James
Jamin
Jamlech
Janna
Janoah, rest
Janum
Japhet
Japheth
Japhia,
Japhlet
Japho
Jarah
Jareb
Jared
Jaresiah
Jarib
Jarmuth
Jasher
Jashobeam
Jashub
Jasiel
Jason
Jathniel
Jattir
Javan
Jazer
Jaziz
Jearim
Jeaterai
Jeberechiah
Jebus
Jebusi
Jecamiah
Jecoliah
Jeconiah,
Jed
Jedaiah
Jediael
Jedidah
Jedidiah
Jeduthun
Jeezer
Jegar-sahadutha
Jehaleleel
Jehdeiah
Jehezekel
Jehiah
Jehizkiah
Jehoadah
Jehoaddan
Jehoahaz
Jehoash
Jehohanan
Jehoiachin
Jehoiada
Jehoiakim
Jehoiarib
Jehonadab
Jehonathan
Jehoram
Jehoshaphat
Jehosheba
Jehoshua
Jehovah to be, exist, I am who am, hath sent me; I am who am with you,
Jehovah-jireh
Jehovah-nissi
Jehovah-shalom
Jehovah-shammah
Jehovah-tsidkenu
Jehozabad
Jehozadak
Jehu
Jehubbah
Jehucal
Jehud
Jehudijah
Jehush
Jekabzeel
Jekameam
Jekamiah
Jekuthiel
Jemima
Jemuel
Jephthah
Jephunneh
Jerah
Jerahmeel
Jered
Jeremai
Jeremiah
Jeremoth
Jeriah
Jericho
Jeriel
Jerijah
Jerimoth
Jerioth
Jeroboam
Jeroham
Jerubbaal
Jerubbesheth
Jeruel
Jerusalem
Jerusha
Jesaiah
Jeshebeab
Jesher
Jeshimon
Jeshishai
Jeshohaia
Jeshua
Jeshurun
Jesiah
Jesimiel
Jesse
Jesui
Jesus, Being interpreted the Christ, in Greek Iesous being pronounced Jesus saviour.
Jether
Jetheth
Jethlah
Jethro
Jetur
Jeuel
Jeush
Jew
Jezaniah
Jezebel
Jezer
Jeziah
Jezoar
Jezrahiah
Jezreel
Jibsam
Jidlaph
Jimnah
Jiphtah
Jiphtah-el
Joab
Joachim
Joah
Joahaz
Joanna
Joash
Joatham
Job
Jobab
Jochebed
Joed
Joel
Joelah
Joezer
Jogbehah
Jogli
Joha
JohananJehovah is or has been gracious.
John
Joiarib
Jokdeam
Jokim
Jokmeam
Jokneam
Jokshan
Joktan
Jonadab
Jonah
Jonan
Jonathan
Joppa
Jorah
Joram
Jordan, Some translate it as "the descender," from the Semitic yrd, "to descend"
Jorim
Josabad
Josaphat
Jose
Joseph, may God add
Joses
Joshah
Joshaviah
Joshbekashah
Joshua
Josiah
Josibiah
Josiphiah
Jotham
Jozabad
Jozachar
Jubal
Jucal
Judah
Judas
Judaea
Judith
Jude
Julia
Julius
Junia
Jushab-hesed
Justus
Juttah

References
Comay, Joan, Who's Who in the Old Testament, Oxford University Press, 1971, 
Lockyer, Herbert, All the men of the Bible, Zondervan Publishing House (Grand Rapids, Michigan), 1958

Inline references 

J